Plavšić or Plavsic is a Serbian surname. Notable people with the surname include:

Biljana Plavšić (born 1930), Bosnian Serb politician
Adrien Plavsic (born 1970), Canadian hockey player
Branko Plavšić (1949–2011), Serbian comic book artist
Srđan Plavšić (born 1996), Serbian football player
 

Serbian surnames